Alexander ‘Alex’ Zelinsky,  (born 5 March 1960) is an Australian computer scientist, systems engineer and roboticist. His career spans innovation, science and technology, research and development, commercial start-ups and education. Professor Zelinsky is Vice-Chancellor and President of the University of Newcastle joining the university in November 2018. He was the Chief Defence Scientist of Australia from March 2012 until November 2018.  As Chief Defence Scientist he led Defence Science and Technology for Australia's Department of Defence.

Career
While studying at the University of Wollongong (UoW), Zelinsky started his career in 1978 as a cadet systems engineer at The Broken Hill Proprietary Company Limited (BHP). In 1984 he joined UoW's academic staff where he taught computer science while completing a PhD in robotics. He worked as a Research Scientist at the National Institute of Advanced Industrial Science and Technology (AIST), Japan, developing computer vision and robotics technologies (1991–1994). He was appointed Professor of Systems Engineering at the Australian National University in 1996, holding that position until 2004. In 2000 as chief executive officer (CEO), he co-founded, and was a non-executive director of, Seeing Machines Limited, a company listed on the London Stock Exchange (2000–2014). He has also been a Senior Executive at CSIRO (2004–2012), where he served as Director of the ICT Centre (2004–2009), and Group Executive of Information Sciences (2007–2012).

Zelinsky was Chief Defence Scientist and head of the Defence Science and Technology Group from March 2012 until November 2018.

On 20 June 2018, Zelinsky was announced as the next Vice-Chancellor and President of the University of Newcastle following the retirement of Caroline McMillen. He assumed the role 19 November 2018.

Qualifications and awards
Zelinsky has a Bachelor of Mathematical Sciences (Honours), a Doctor of Philosophy, and in 2010 was awarded an honorary Doctor of Science, all from the University of Wollongong. He also served as a member of the University of Wollongong Council (2012–2015).

Zelinsky is a Fellow of: 
the Australian Academy of Science (FAA);
the Institute of Electrical and Electronics Engineers (FIEEE);
the Australian Academy of Technological Sciences and Engineering (FTSE);  
the Institute of Engineers Australia (Hon FIEAust); 
the Australian Institute of Company Directors (FAICD); and
the Royal Society of New South Wales (FRSN).

Zelinsky’s awards and appointments include: 
In 2003, 2004, and 2005, the World Economic Forum selected him as a Technology Pioneer in recognition of his commercialisation of technology with Seeing Machines.
In May 2005 he was awarded the ATSE's Clunies-Ross Award "for successful innovation involving the application of science and technology for the benefit of Australia".  
Since 2008 he has been named as one of Australia's 100 most influential engineers.
In 2011 he led the CSIRO team named as a Global Supplier of the Year by Boeing.
In 2012 he was named as an Innovation Hero by The Warren Centre for Advanced Engineering.
In 2013 he was awarded the Trevor Pearcey Medal by the Pearcey Foundation for "distinguished lifetime achievement and contribution to the development and growth of the ICT professions, research and industry in Australia".
In 2015 he was awarded the M A Sargent Medal  by Engineers Australia for outstanding professional contributions to engineering.
In 2017 he was appointed an Officer of the Order of Australia (AO) in the 2017 Queen's birthday honours. Dr Zelinsky was recognised "for distinguished service to defence science and technology, to systems engineering, and to education as an academic and researcher".
In 2019 he was inducted by the Royal Institution of Australia as a Bragg Fellow

Lists of publications
 
 
 Robotics Systems Laboratory, (Australian National University)

References

External links
Lessons learned about science and innovation

  

1960 births
Academic staff of the Australian National University
Chief Defence Scientists
CSIRO people
Fellow Members of the IEEE
Fellows of the Australian Academy of Technological Sciences and Engineering
Living people
Officers of the Order of Australia
University of Wollongong alumni
Academic staff of the University of Wollongong
Fellows of the Australian Institute of Company Directors
Fellows of the Royal Society of New South Wales